Giorgio Salvini (24 April 1920 – 8 April 2015) was an Italian physicist and politician.

Life
Born in Milan, in 1953 Salvini was responsible for the construction of the first Italian circular particle accelerator, the electron synchrotron of Frascati ("elettrosincrotrone di Frascati"). Between 1966 and 1970 he was president of the Istituto Nazionale di Fisica Nucleare (INFN). Salvini took part in the CERN experiment that led to the discovery of the W and Z bosons.

He served as president of the Accademia dei Lincei from 1990 to 1994.

He was Minister of University, Scientific Research and Technology in the Dini 1995-1996 cabinet.

Notes

References
. The "Yearbook" of the renowned Italian scientific institution, including an historical sketch of its history, the list of all past and present members as well as a wealth of information about its academic and scientific activities.
. 
. The biographical and bibliographical entry, including a list of publications and updated up to 1976, on Giorgio Salvini, published under the auspices of the Accademia dei Lincei in a book collecting many profiles of its living members up to 1976.

 

1920 births
2015 deaths
Scientists from Milan
Members of the Lincean Academy
20th-century  Italian  physicists
People associated with CERN
Politicians from Milan